Senator Parsons may refer to:

Cornelius R. Parsons (1842–1901), New York State Senate
Henry Parsons (Massachusetts politician), Massachusetts State Senate
John M. Parsons (1866–1946), Virginia State Senate
Mosby Monroe Parsons (1822–1865), Missouri State Senate
Robert E. Parsons (1892–1966), Connecticut State Senate
Thomas Parsons (politician) (1814–1873), New York State Senate
William Henry Parsons (colonel) (1826–1907), Texas State Senate

See also
Mike Parson (born 1955), Missouri State Senate